Fort Tuthill is a former National Guard training facility and a county park situated in Coconino County, Arizona. The fort is listed on the National Register of Historic Places.

History
Fort Tuthill was built in 1930 as a training facility for National Guardsmen. During the summers, the fort would host up to 3,000 people from around the southwest. The fort closed around 1948.

Fort Tuthill is now a county park and the site of a fairgrounds. Luke Air Force Base operates a military recreation area at Fort Tuthill. The Fort Tuthill military history museum is also located on the site. The site of the fort was renovated in 2017 to restore its historic nature.

References

External links
Fort Tuthill County Park
Fort Tuthill Military Museum
Fort Tuthill Luke AFB Recreation Area

Populated places in Coconino County, Arizona